"Theory" is a poem from Wallace Stevens's first book of poetry,  Harmonium. It was first published in 1917, so it is in the public domain.

Interpretation

Buttel interprets the poem as one of Stevens's attempts to approach the rhythms of prose, as part of a strategic understatement that moves into a poem in an offhand, 'anti-poetic' way. He sees that the instances must carry the strength of the theory, but he says nothing about how to understand theory in Stevens's specific sense, and nothing about what strength amounts to in this context.

Compare the opening line to Byron's assertion in the first lines of Canto III, Stanza LXXII of Childe Harold's Pilgrimage: "I live not in myself, but I become / Portion of that around me."

Notes

References 
 Buttel, Robert. Wallace Stevens: The Making of Harmonium. 1967: Princeton University Press.

 
1917 poems
American poems
Poetry by Wallace Stevens